Martinstown Castle is a ruined castle located in the townland of Martinstown, south of Delvin, County Westmeath, Ireland. The ruin consists of a three-story tower with an interior staircase. Due to similarities with Talbot's Castle in Trim, County Meath, the castle is believed to date back to the 15th Century.

See also 
 Delvin (civil parish)

References 

Castles in Ireland
Castles in County Westmeath